Polysiphonia opaca (C.Agardh) Moris et De Notaris is a small marine alga in the division Rhodophyta.

Description
This small seaweed consists of tufts of branches no more than 6 cm long. The tufts are of erect branches each consisting a series of axial cells surrounded by about 20 periaxial cells all of the same forming a "collar" around the axis. There is no cortication and the plant is attached by rhizoids which attach the plant to a surface.
This alga may be confused with Lophosiphonia reptabunda, this alga has however a turf-like habit and is less than 3 cm high unlike P. opaca which grows to over 5 cm high.

Distribution
Very rare, recorded from the south of Wales. Europe: British Isles to Spain, West Indies and E.Australia.

References

Rhodomelaceae
Taxa named by Carl Adolph Agardh